Zheng Jie was the defending champion, but chose not to participate that year.

Agnieszka Radwańska won in the final 6–1, 6–1, against Vera Dushevina.

Seeds

Qualifying

Draw

Finals

Top half

Bottom half

External links
Draws

Nordea Nordic Light Open
Singles 2007
Nordic